Once de Septiembre is a town in Tres de Febrero Partido of Buenos Aires Province, Argentina. It is located in the Greater Buenos Aires urban agglomeration. The name is often spelt "Once de Setiembre" (both spellings are correct) or "11 de Setiembre/Septiembre".

The town is named for the September 11, 1852, rebellion of Buenos Aires against the Federal government of General Justo José de Urquiza.

Population
With only 4,355 inhabitants, Once de Septiembre is the least populous district in Tres de Febrero Partido.

External links

References

Populated places in Buenos Aires Province
Tres de Febrero Partido